Greg Steven Deane (born December 6, 1957 in Tulare, California) is an American retired professional basketball shooting guard who spent one season in the National Basketball Association (NBA) as a member of the Utah Jazz during the 1979–80 season. He attended the University of Utah where he played on the school's basketball team. The Jazz drafted Deane during the fourth round of the 1979 NBA draft. His son Daniel Deane played basketball at the University of Utah and Oregon State University and his daughter Lauren Deane played basketball at Weber State University and professionally oversees in Canada.

References

External links
 

1957 births
Living people
American men's basketball players
Basketball players from California
People from Tulare, California
Shooting guards
Utah Jazz draft picks
Utah Jazz players
Utah Utes men's basketball players